Muslim Sadulaev (born 17 October 1995) is a Russian freestyle wrestler. He won the silver medal in the 57 kg event at the 2019 European Wrestling Championships held in Bucharest, Romania.

Career 

He won one of the bronze medals in the 57 kg event at the 2018 Russian National Freestyle Wrestling Championships held in Odintsovo, Moscow Oblast, Russia. A year later, in 2019, he won the silver medal in this event.

At the Golden Grand Prix Ivan Yarygin 2019 held in Krasnoyarsk, Russia, he won the gold medal in the 57 kg event.

Major results

References

External links 
 

Living people
1995 births
People from Kurchaloyevsky District
Russian male sport wrestlers
European Wrestling Championships medalists
Sportspeople from Chechnya
21st-century Russian people